Nawab Sayyid Hamid Ali Khan Bahadur   (31 August 1875–19 June 1930) was Nawab of the princely state of Rampur from 1889 to 1930.

He was only thirteen (but turning fourteen years of age) when he ascended the throne of Rampur, he ruled under a regency to 1896, when Victor Bruce, 9th Earl of Elgin invested him with full ruling powers. During his reign, his salute was raised from 13-guns to 15 as a result of Sir Hamid's army seeing distinguished service in the Middle East, Afghanistan and German East Africa during World War I. A staunch supporter of higher education, Sir Nawab Hamid gave generously to many colleges across the subcontinent, including the Lucknow Medical College and Aligarh Muslim University, also greatly expanding the number of educational institutions within his state. He was instrumental in foundation of Shia College, Lucknow.

Dying in 1930 at the age of 54, after a 41-year reign, Sir Hamid was buried at Karbala, Iraq. He was succeeded by his son, Sir Raza Ali Khan Bahadur.

Titles
1875–1889: Nawabzada Sayyid Hamid Ali Khan Bahadur
1889–1895: His Highness 'Ali Jah, Farzand-i-Dilpazir-i- Daulat-i-Inglishia, Mukhlis ud-Daula, Nasir ul-Mulk, Amir ul- Umara, Nawab Sayyid Hamid 'Ali Khan Bahadur, Mustaid Jang, Nawab of Rampur
1895–1897: Captain His Highness 'Ali Jah, Farzand-i-Dilpazir-i- Daulat-i-Inglishia, Mukhlis ud-Daula, Nasir ul-Mulk, Amir ul- Umara, Nawab Sayyid Hamid 'Ali Khan Bahadur, Mustaid Jang, Nawab of Rampur
1897–1905: Major His Highness 'Ali Jah, Farzand-i-Dilpazir-i- Daulat-i-Inglishia, Mukhlis ud-Daula, Nasir ul-Mulk, Amir ul- Umara, Nawab Sayyid Hamid 'Ali Khan Bahadur, Mustaid Jang, Nawab of Rampur
1906–1908: Major His Highness 'Ali Jah, Farzand-i-Dilpazir-i- Daulat-i-Inglishia, Mukhlis ud-Daula, Nasir ul-Mulk, Amir ul- Umara, Nawab Sayyid Sir Hamid 'Ali Khan Bahadur, Mustaid Jang, Nawab of Rampur, GCIE
1908–1910: Lieutenant-Colonel His Highness 'Ali Jah, Farzand-i-Dilpazir-i- Daulat-i-Inglishia, Mukhlis ud-Daula, Nasir ul-Mulk, Amir ul- Umara, Nawab Sayyid Sir Hamid 'Ali Khan Bahadur, Mustaid Jang, Nawab of Rampur, GCIE
1910–1911: Colonel His Highness 'Ali Jah, Farzand-i-Dilpazir-i- Daulat-i-Inglishia, Mukhlis ud-Daula, Nasir ul-Mulk, Amir ul- Umara, Nawab Sayyid Sir Hamid 'Ali Khan Bahadur, Mustaid Jang, Nawab of Rampur, GCIE
1911–1922: Colonel His Highness 'Ali Jah, Farzand-i-Dilpazir-i- Daulat-i-Inglishia, Mukhlis ud-Daula, Nasir ul-Mulk, Amir ul- Umara, Nawab Sayyid Sir Hamid 'Ali Khan Bahadur, Mustaid Jang, Nawab of Rampur, GCIE, GCVO
1922–1928: Colonel His Highness 'Ali Jah, Farzand-i-Dilpazir-i- Daulat-i-Inglishia, Mukhlis ud-Daula, Nasir ul-Mulk, Amir ul- Umara, Nawab Sayyid Sir Hamid 'Ali Khan Bahadur, Mustaid Jang, Nawab of Rampur, GCSI, GCIE, GCVO
1928–1930: Major-General His Highness 'Ali Jah, Farzand-i-Dilpazir-i- Daulat-i-Inglishia, Mukhlis ud-Daula, Nasir ul-Mulk, Amir ul- Umara, Nawab Sayyid Sir Hamid 'Ali Khan Bahadur, Mustaid Jang, Nawab of Rampur, GCSI, GCIE, GCVO

Honours

(ribbon bar, as it would look today)

Delhi Durbar Gold Medal-1903
Knight Grand Commander of the Order of the Indian Empire (GCIE) – 1908
Delhi Durbar Gold Medal-1911
Knight Grand Cross of the Royal Victorian Order (GCVO) – 1911
Knight Grand Commander of the Order of the Star of India (GCSI) – 1921 Birthday Honours

Footnotes

External links

Hamid Ali Khan
Knights Grand Commander of the Order of the Star of India
Knights Grand Commander of the Order of the Indian Empire
Indian Knights Grand Cross of the Royal Victorian Order
Indian Shia Muslims
1875 births
1930 deaths
Founders of Indian schools and colleges